Whenever You're Ready is the second studio album by Seattle rock band Flop. The band's only major label release, the album was released in September 1993.

Recording 
Whenever You're Ready was recorded at Hanzsek Audio in Seattle, Washington. The record was produced by punk-era producer Martin Rushent.

Release
Whenever You're Ready was released on 21 September 1993. The record was issued in Europe on CD by 550 Music, in Japan through Epic, and in the United States by 550, Epic and Frontier Records jointly. On cassette, the album saw release in the US through 550. Whenever You're Ready was made available digitally in 2019.

Musical style 
The music of Whenever You're Ready has been described as "idiosyncratic power pop that paired soaring, Beach Boy harmonies and fuzzy guitars".

Commercial performance
Whenever You're Ready was apparently deemed a commercial failure by Sony, with the record failing to chart. Nevertheless, J.D. Considine of the Baltimore Sun remarked that the band were "doing pretty well" with the record, having attracted college radio airplay and even making an appearance on MTV's "120 Minutes".

Allusions
A demo version of the album track "Julie Francavilla" appeared in the 1996 documentary Hype!, and was included on Hype! The Motion Picture Soundtrack.

Track listing

Personnel 
Flop
Rusty Willoughby - vocals, guitar
Bill Campbell - guitar
Paul Schurr - bass, background vocals
Nate Johnson - drums
Additional musicians
Kim "Car Crash" Carter - cello

References

1993 albums
Albums produced by Martin Rushent